"Todo Puede Inspirar" (In English: Anything Can Inspire) is the fourth studio album by the Mexican  Latin Jazz singer Magos Herrera.

Background and Theme

Fourth studio album Magos Herrera with 8 of his themes emphasizing "Todo Puede Inspirar" and 3 subjects by artists such as The Beatles ("Norwegian Wood"), José Alfredo Jiménez ("Cuando Salga La Luna" in bossa nova version) and Edu Lobo (Pra dizer adeus). Includes a remix.

Track listing

 "Definición" (Definition)
 "Todo Puede Inspirar" (Anything Can Inspire)
 "Rosa" (Rose)
 "Sol De Lisboa" (Lisboa's Sun)
 "Azul" (Blue)
 "Santiago" (Santiago)
 "Norwegian Wood"
 "Serenata" (Serenade)
 "Blanca Pasarela" (White Gateway)
 "Pra Dizer Adeus"
 "Todo puede inspirar" (Remixed by Alvaro Ruiz)

References 

Magos Herrera albums
2005 albums